"The writing on the wall" is an idiomatic expression that suggests a portent of doom or misfortune, based on the story of Belshazzar's feast in the book of Daniel.

The Writing on the Wall, The Writing's on the Wall or similar titles may also refer to:

Books 
 The Writing on the Wall, alternate title of The Transylvanian Trilogy, a 1930s Hungarian trilogy by Miklós Bánffy
 The Writing on the Wall, a 1985 British book by Phillip Whitehead 
 "The Writing on the Wall", a 1999 short story by Guy N. Smith
 The Writing on the Wall, a 2007 British book on the Chinese economy by Will Hutton
 Writing on the Wall, a 2004 Indian novel by Sundararajan Padmanabhan
 Writing on the Wall, a 1998 collection of political cartoons by Tony Namate
 The Writing on the Wall, a 2005 novel by Lynne Sharon Schwartz

Film and television 

 The Writing on the Wall (film), a 1910 silent short film
 "The Writing on the Wall" (Yes Minister), a 1980 television episode
 The Writing on the Wall (TV series), a 1996 BBC four-part thriller television series starring Bill Paterson and Lena Stolze
 "The Writing on the Wall" (Agents of S.H.I.E.L.D.), a 2014 television episode
 "Week 6: The Writing on the Wall", a 2005 episode of The Apprentice
 Writing on the Wall, a 2007 Canadian documentary produced by Indigo Books and Music

Music

Bands
Writing on the Wall (band), a Scottish rock group of the late 1960s and early 1970s.

Albums 
 The Writing's on the Wall, a 1999 album by Destiny's Child
 Writing on the Wall (Bucks Fizz album), 1986
 The Writing on the Wall, a 1998 compilation album by Desmond Dekker 
 Writing on the Wall, a 1983 album by One Way System 
 Writing on the Wall, a 2003 album by Jill Phillips
 Writing on the Wall, a 2009 mixtape by Gucci Mane

Songs 
 "The Writing on the Wall" (Adam Wade song), a 1961 Top 5 single by Adam Wade
 "Writing on the Wall", a 1969 single by Desmond Dekker
 "The Writing's on The Wall", by Jim Reeves, 1971
 "The Writing's on the Wall", by Three Dog Night from the 1972 album Seven Separate Fools
 "Writing on the Wall", by Ted Nugent from the 1976 album Free-for-All
 "Writing on The Wall", by Eddie and the Hot Rods, 1976
 "Writing on The Wall", by the Hollies, 1977
 "Writing on the Wall", by Lene Lovich from the 1978 album Stateless
 "Writing on the Wall", by Cheap Trick from the 1979 album Dream Police
 "Writing on the Wall", by Hazel O'Connor from the 1980 soundtrack album for the musical film Breaking Glass
 "Writing on the Wall", by RIOT 111 from the 1982 EP Subversive Radicals
 "Writing's on the Wall", by Bruce Foxton from Touch Sensitive, 1983
 "The Writing on the Wall", from the 1985 musical Drood
 "Writing on the Wall", by Earth, Wind And Fire, B-side of 1987 single "System of Survival"
 "Writing on the Wall", a 1989 single by George Jones
 "Writing on the Wall", by Dag Kolsrud and One 2 Many, 1989
 "Written on the Walls", by Iced Earth from the 1991 album Iced Earth
 "Writing on the Wall", by Accept from the 1994 album Death Row
 "Writing on the Wall", by Five Star from the 1995 album Heart and Soul
 "Writing on the Wall", by Lee "Scratch" Perry and Mad Professor from the 1995 album Super Ape Inna Jungle
 "Writing on the Wall", by Vince Neil from the 1995 album Carved In Stone
 "Writing on the Wall", by Blackmore's Night from the 1997 album Shadow of the Moon
 "Writing's on the Wall", by George Harrison from the 1981 album Somewhere in England
 "Writing's on the Wall", by Green Carnation from the 2003 album A Blessing in Disguise
 "Writing's on the Wall" (The Tea Party song) 2004
 "Writing on the Wall", by Adrian Belew from the 2005 album Side One
 "Writing on the Walls", by Underoath from the 2006 album Define the Great Line
 "Writing's on the Wall" (Plan B song), 2010
 "Writings on the Wall", by Social Distortion from the 2012 album Hard Times and Nursery Rhymes
 "The Writing's on the Wall" (OK Go song), 2014
 "Writings on the Wall", by Parkway Drive from the 2015 album Ire
 "Writing's on the Wall" (Sam Smith song), from the 2015 James Bond film Spectre
 "Writing on the Wall", by Bouncing Souls from the 2016 album Simplicity
 "Writing on the Wall", by Alter Bridge from the 2016 album The Last Hero
 "Writing on the Wall" (French Montana song), a 2019 song featuring Cardi B, Post Malone and Rvssian
 "The Writing on the Wall" (Iron Maiden song), from the 2021 album Senjutsu

See also 
 Graffiti, a form of street art that involves writing on walls